The lesbian, gay, bisexual, transgender, queer, and other non-heterosexual or non-cisgender (LGBTQ+) community is prevalent within sports across the world.

There have been several notable outspoken homosexual athletes, including John Curry, Billie Jean King, boxer Orlando Cruz and Jason Collins. In the 1980s, Tom Waddell, an Olympic decathlete, hosted the first Gay Games in San Francisco. Since then, many homosexual sporting organizations have been founded along with sporting events that feature homosexual athletes.

While overall, the trend is towards open acceptance of LGBTQ+ athletes, the level of acceptance can vary due to factors such as the athlete's age, sport, and location. As a consequence of the existing homophobia in the sports community, there have been notable lawsuits fighting against this discrimination.

Notable LGBTQ+ athletes

John Curry 
Born in 1949, John Curry was a successful British figure skater. Using his unique skating style, Curry won the Gold Medal in the 1976 Olympic Games in Innsbruck, Austria. Two days after his victory, Curry confirmed a newspaper report about his sexuality, becoming one of the first openly gay gold medalists. Less than three weeks later, and amid the fallout from the revelations, Curry won gold again at the World Figure Skating Championships in Gothenburg. He had completed a "grand slam" of European, Olympic and World championships in under fifty days. Curry died at the age of 44 after a fight with AIDS.

Billie Jean King 
Billie Jean King is a former number one women's tennis player in the world and, according to KK Ottesen of the Washington Post, is known as a feminist icon. She was born in the United States in 1943 and competed professionally throughout the 1960s and 1970s. More than a decade after her athletic career, King was outed as lesbian by a former lover, something King had not yet openly announced. After this revelation, King took a stronger stance on the push for gay rights and continued to vouch for gender equality, specifically equal pay. In 2009, she was awarded a Presidential Medal of Freedom by the White House in recognition of her involvement in pushing for gender equality and the fact she was a notable and successful openly lesbian athlete.

Jason Collins 
Jason Collins, born in 1978, was a US collegiate and professional basketball player. Collins played Division One basketball at Stanford University where he received First Team All-Pac10 honors in the 2000-2001 season. Later, he was drafted in the first round of the National Basketball Association (NBA) draft where he played 13 seasons. In 2013, Collins came out as gay in a Sports Illustrated article written in the first person with the help of a journalist, which officially made him the first openly gay NBA player. Although his reveal did not come without its critics, Collins received positive support and was pictured on the cover of Time Magazine's Top 100 Most Influential People.

Michael Sam 
Michael Sam, born in 1990, was a US collegiate football player at the University of Missouri. At Missouri, in his final season in 2013, Sam was named the Southeastern Conference (SEC) Defensive Player of the Year, and he was also named an All-American. Following his collegiate career, in an interview with ESPN, Sam openly came out as gay. In April 2014, Sam was selected in the seventh round of the National Football League (NFL) draft by the St. Louis Rams, becoming the first openly gay athlete ever to be drafted into the NFL. Subsequently, Sam was awarded the 2014 ESPYS Arthur Ashe Courage Award for "courageously announc[ing] he was gay prior to the NFL draft."

Megan Rapinoe 
Megan Rapinoe, born in 1985, is a notable women's soccer player. Rapinoe is a two-time FIFA Women's World Cup champion with the United States women's national soccer team, the latter of which she was awarded the Golden Boot and Golden Ball award for her performance in the tournament. Rapinoe is openly lesbian, and in 2013 she received the Board of Directors Award by the Los Angeles Gay and Lesbian Center for her role in activism for the LGBTQ+ community. The world champion is also well known for her activism in other sectors, such as gender and racial inequality.

Homophobia in sports culture 
Heteronormativity, from professional sports to children's athletics, can be seen as the dominant paradigm in sports culture. It is defined as the view of heterosexuality as the standard or preferred sexuality, and this exclusive way of thinking is often taken to the extreme in sports culture, which subsequently places an emphasis on hegemonic masculinity. Arnd Krüger has shown that the history of homosexuality in sports is closely linked to the history of sports and goes back to antiquity. The prevalence of heteronormative thinking in athletics has led to a sports culture that is traditionally highly intolerant to homosexuality. This homophobic attitude has been documented in adolescent sports especially, as a recent study by Danny Osborne and William E. Wagner, III showed that male adolescents who participated in popular sports, such as football, basketball, and baseball were significantly more likely to hold homophobic attitudes than other peers their age.

In a 2009 study on the well being of same-sex-attracted youth in the United States, Lindsey Wilkinson and Jennifer Pearson found that lower self-esteem and higher rates of depression in same-sex attracted youth were correlated with the prevalence of football in high schools. Sociology researchers Sartore and Cunningham also found similar stigmatization in the view of homosexual coaches, as high school parents were shown to be unwilling to allow their children to be coached by someone who is gay or lesbian. They also found a similar attitude from high school athletes themselves toward participating on teams coached by either gay or lesbian coaches. Despite the apparent prevalence of homophobic thinking in athletic culture, recent scholars have documented an increasing trend toward openly gay athletes in high school and collegiate level sports.

This trend, however, has not been seen in professional sports, where homosexuality remains largely stigmatized in the four major North American professional sports leagues. Only Jason Collins of the NBA, along with Carl Nassib and Michael Sam of the NFL, have come out while actively playing, and a small number of athletes have come out after their careers such as Wade Davis, Kwame Harris, Dave Kopay, Ryan O'Callaghan, Roy Simmons, and Esera Tuaolo (NFL); Billy Bean and Glenn Burke (MLB); and John Amaechi (NBA). This same trend can also be found in England's Professional Footballers' Association (PFA), as a recent ad campaign devised by the PFA against homophobia failed because no professional football player was willing to associate themselves with the advertisement. The trend is also prevalent among English Football fans, as a recent study published in 2018 demonstrates that among live attendance fans, the use of homophobic slurs is extremely common. The study finds that the motive behind the offensive language is that the fans are"try[ing] to gain an advantage for their team."

Sociologists who have examined the issue of lesbians in American sport in the 1980s and 1990s found overt and covert mechanisms of social discrimination. However, homophobia has been on a rapid decline over previous decades, and studies show attitudes toward female homosexuality in sports have improved since the research conducted on lesbian athletes in the mid-1990s.

There has been an increase in the number of individual athletes who have publicly come out as LGBTQ. Additionally, there have been many recent attempts by organizations such as the National Center for Lesbian Rights (NCLR) to break down homophobic attitudes in collegiate and professional team sports. The NCLR has worked with the San Francisco 49ers and collegiate athletic departments at universities such as North Carolina, Florida, and Stanford to revise team policies to more openly accommodate LBGT athletes.

Out on the Fields, a survey initiated in 2015 by members of the organizing committee of Bingham Cup Sydney 2014, the world cup of gay rugby, and members of the Sydney Convicts, Australia's first gay rugby union club, is the first and largest study conducted on homophobia in sports. It surveyed 9494 athletes with varying sexual identities (25% of which identified as heterosexual). The survey found that only 1% of the participants believed that lesbian, gay, and bisexual athletes were 'completely accepted' in sports culture, while 80% of respondents said they had witnessed or experienced homophobia in a sporting environment. The rates and occurrences of discrimination based on sexuality in sports are high with 62% of survey respondents claiming that homophobia is more common in team sports than any other part of society. Additionally, the study found that the United States was the least LGBTQ+ inclusive country, while Canada ranked the most inclusive.

There is also a gender difference in the responses to male and female athletes who come out as LGBT. Brittney Griner softened the blowback from announcing her sexuality by casually coming out in an interview almost immediately after being drafted into the WNBA. This was a month before Jason Collins came out, and there was a media uproar for him while there was barely any coverage over Griner's announcement.

The National Collegiate Athletic Association announced its support of LGBT student-athletes, coaches, and administrators in intercollegiate athletics. Since then, the association has been defending its core values of equality, inclusion, fairness, and respect in regard to all people involved in NCAA sports and events. The defense of these values has very publicly come into play in determining host cities for championship events. The NCAA expressed concern over Indiana's Religious Freedom Restoration Act and the hosting of the 2015 Men's Basketball Final Four Tournament, and it banned North Carolina from hosting championship events until 2019 after it passed the Public Facilities Privacy and Security Act (H.B. 2).

Legal cases in the United States
The case of Jennifer Harris against Penn State, more specifically their women's basketball coach Rene Portland brought change to the world of sports. In 2006, a gay rights advocacy group, the National Center for Lesbian Rights, accused Rene Portland of forcing Jennifer Harris to transfer because of bias against lesbians. The advocacy group claimed that Portland was biased against lesbians for decades and cited a 1986 interview in which she claimed she talked to recruits and parents of recruits about lesbians stating, "I will not have it in my program." There were also claims of Portland telling key recruits—to discourage them from attending another school—that the other team was "full of lesbians." The lawsuit was eventually settled out of court and Penn State found Portland in violation of policy. She was fined $10,000 by the university in lieu of a one-game suspension and warned that another infraction would result in the termination of her employment. Rene Portland eventually resigned from her position as women's head basketball coach.

LGBT leagues, teams, events, and individuals coming out

In the absence of openly LGBT sportspersons, LGBT-focused leagues and events have been created since the late 1970s. One of the earliest-recorded gay sports event organizing committees is the Federation of Gay Games (initially known as the United States Gay Olympics Committee), which was established in 1980 by Tom Waddell, Mark Brown and Paul Mart to organize the first Gay Games (1982) in San Francisco. Another organization, Apollo - Friends in Sports, was established in 1981 to organize the Western Cup, a multi-sport event for gay and lesbian athletes in Calgary, Alberta. By 1989, the European Gay and Lesbian Sport Federation was formed to organize the EuroGames for LGBT athletes in Europe.

In 2006, a schism occurred between the Federation of Gay Games and the Montreal organizing committee for the Gay Games, leading to the Montreal committee organizing a rival multi-sports event, the World Outgames, which shut down due to financial struggles in 2017. The sponsoring organization for the Outgames, the Gay and Lesbian International Sport Association, has also organized smaller, regional multi-sports events, including the North American and AsiaPacific Outgames.

In 2002, the Bingham Cup was created, becoming the first gay rugby world cup games. These games were created in order to promote the game of Rugby as an all-inclusive, global sport.

Australia
The Sydney Convicts Rugby Club was launched in 2004 as Australia's first gay rugby union team.

Australia, in accordance with the World Gay Boxing Championships, has announced they will hold the first ever LGBTQ+ inclusive boxing tournament in 2023.

Canada
Canada is home to a large LGBT sports community, having hosted the inaugural World OutGames. Local organizations like Équipe Montréal, OutSport Toronto and Team Vancouver represent LGBT sport within their respective cities.

Canada was also a leader in creating the Pride House facilities for LGBT athletes at sporting events, organizing the first-ever Olympic Pride House when Vancouver hosted the 2010 Winter Olympics. Similarly, Toronto's Pride House during the 2015 Pan American Games was the first time a Pride House facility was available at the Pan Ams. At the 2018 Olympic Games in South Korea, the Canadian athletes' pavilion also doubled as a Pride House for all LGBT athletes at the games regardless of nationality, due to South Korean organizers' reluctance to organize a Pride House of their own.

In December 2013, The 519 received Toronto City Council approval to build a sports and recreation centre focused on sport inclusion. Once built, the new centre will provide a home to Toronto's over 6,000 LGBT sport participants.

Canadian media have also often been leaders in covering the issue of homophobia in sports; in 1993, CBC Radio aired a groundbreaking hour-long documentary on LGBT sportspeople as a special episode of its sports series The Inside Track. Canadian filmmakers have also produced a number of notable documentary films about LGBT issues in sport, including Noam Gonick's To Russia with Love (2014), Michael Del Monte's Transformer (2017) and Paul-Émile d'Entremont's Standing on the Line (2019). The Canadian drama film Breakfast with Scot, about a gay retired hockey player, was authorized by the Toronto Maple Leafs to use the team's real name and logo in the film, the first LGBT-themed film ever approved by a sports team.

Canadian sports teams are active partners in You Can Play, an international initiative to combat homophobia in sports. The initiative was launched in 2012 by Brian Burke while he was general manager of the Toronto Maple Leafs, but is active in both Canada and the United States. The Canadian Olympic Committee also organizes #oneteam, a speakers bureau for LGBTQ identified and supportive athletes to speak on homophobia in sports.

France
Paris Foot Gay was established in 2003.

In 2018, France hosted the 10th Gay Games, helping to raise awareness for LGBTQ+ rights.

India
Dutee Chand, a prominent female Indian athlete, came out in 2019 when she told reporters she is in a same-sex relationship. Her decision made her India's first openly gay athlete and was met by protests from her hometown, where she was declared an outcast.  A couple of months later, in Italy's Universiade in 2019, she claimed the gold medal.

Ireland
The first gay rugby team in Ireland, Emerald Warriors RFC, was established in 2003.

Ten-time national track and field winner Dennis Finnegan of Ireland came out as gay in 2020 as a guest on the Five Rings To Rule Them All podcast. Finnegan expressed on the podcast that he did so to give members of the LGBTQ+ community more "confidence."

United Kingdom

The first openly gay football team in the United Kingdom is Stonewall F.C. and was formed in 1991. Two years earlier, Gay Football Supporters Network was formed; a GFSN National League was formed later in 2002 among GFSN members who wanted to participate in amateur competition as well as support major professional teams.

The first openly gay rugby team in the world, the Kings Cross Steelers, was formed in 1995 in London. The first openly gay rugby team in Northern Ireland, the Ulster Titans, was formed in 2007, and the first Scottish gay rugby team, the Caledonian Thebans RFC, was formed in 2002.

In 1996, Graces Cricket Club was organized as the first gay cricket club in the world.

Ishigaki Ju Jitsu Club began in 1994 and prides itself on being the 'Only LGBT Ju Jitsu Club in the World'.

The first decade of the 21st century saw two high-profile Welsh rugby union figures come out while active. First, in 2007, international referee Nigel Owens came out. Then, in 2009, Gareth Thomas, at the time the country's most-capped player (and later a rugby league international), came out. Thomas was believed to be the first professional male player in a team sport to come out while active.

In 1990, Justin Fashanu became the first openly gay British footballer. He died eight years later, in 1998.

The world's first LGBTQA inclusive lacrosse team, the Rainbow Rexes were founded in 2018.

United States

In 1974, the LA Union Thursday Pool League was established as the first gay competitive pool league in the United States.

In 1975, former football player David Kopay was the first professional athlete from a major team to come out. After the public strongly denied Kopay’s claims of other gay professional athletes, a study found that around 25% of all college athletes have had gay experiences.

The Big Apple Softball League (initially known as the Manhattan Community Athletic Association) was initially formed in 1977 for gay softball players in the New York City area.  That same year, the North American Gay Amateur Athletic Alliance was formed for future gay softball teams.

1980s
The New York Ramblers began in 1980 when an ad was placed in the Village Voice to gay men who wanted to play soccer as a team called the Rambles.

In 1980, the International Gay Bowling Organization (IGBO) was formed.

In 1991, the Gay and Lesbian Tennis Alliance was formed at the July 1991 San Diego Open. The first local gay tennis organizations were formed in Dallas and Los Angeles in 1979. The San Francisco, Houston and San Diego followed through 1983. 

In 1982, the West Hollywood Aquatics was formed as a swim and water polo team. That same year, the West Hollywood Wrestling Club was organized as the first gay competitive wrestling team in the United States.

In 1985, the Los Angeles Blades was organized as the first gay hockey team in the United States.

In 1986, following the second Gay Games, Tony Jasinski organized the San Francisco Gay Basketball Association by organizing basketball games at the Hamilton United Methodist Church's Earl Paltenghi Youth Center Gymnasium.

1990s
In 1998, the Washington Renegades RFC was formed as the first gay rugby team in the United States.

In 1999, the New York City Gay Hockey Association was organized.

2010s
In 2010, the DC Gay Flag Football League was founded, joining two dozen other teams as part of the National Gay Flag Football League.

In 2013, soccer's Robbie Rogers and basketball's Jason Collins each publicly came out as gay.

In 2014, football's Michael Sam publicly came out as gay at the NFL draft.

2020s 
In October 2020, WNBA star Sue Bird and FIFA World Cup Champion Megan Rapinoe became engaged to marry.

In June 2021, Carl Nassib, then of the Las Vegas Raiders, became the first active NFL player to come out as gay.

In July 2021, Luke Prokop, who was drafted by the Nashville Predators in the 2020 NHL Entry Draft, became the first active player signed to a National Hockey League contract to come out as gay.

Further reading 
 Beasley, Neil (2016) Football's Coming Out: Life as a Gay Fan and Player. [London]: Floodlit Dreams Ltd. 
 Magrath, Rory (2016) Inclusive Masculinities in Contemporary Football: Men in the Beautiful Game. Abingdon: Routledge. 
 Rogers, Robbie; Marcus, Eric (2014) Coming Out to Play. London: The Robson Press.

See also

 European Gay and Lesbian Sport Federation
 Federation of Gay Games
 Gay Football Supporters Network
 Homosexuality in American football
 Homosexuality in association football
 Homosexuality in English football
 Homosexuality in sports in the United States
 International Gay and Lesbian Football Association
 International Gay Rugby
 List of IGLFA member clubs
 List of lesbian, gay, bisexual, and transgender sportspeople
 Principle 6 campaign
 Transgender people in sports
 World Outgames

References

External links
 10 Openly Gay Footballers. History of World Football. lgbtworldchannel, 29 July 2016. YouTube (11:45 min)
 Keegan Hirst. UK Rugby Player coming out story. ITV: Good Morning Britain, 18 August 2015, YouTube (06:39 min)
 Homosexuality In Sports Now Impossible To Ignore - AP, Steve Wilstein, 21 June 1995